Yalla is a folk rock band from Uzbekistan. They appeared in 1970 and in the 1970s–1980s, were popular all over the Soviet Union and Warsaw Pact countries. The most prominent song of Yalla was "У́чкудук, три коло́дца" (trans. Uchkuduk, tri kalodtsa; Russian for "Uchkuduk, three water wells"), released in 1981, and one of the most popular hits in the USSR in 1980s. They sing in Uzbek, Russian, and occasionally some other languages, such as Arabic, German and Tatar.

The leader of the band is Farrukh Zokirov.
The members of Yalla are graduates of the Ostrovsky Theatrical Art Institute and the Ashrafi State Conservatory in Tashkent. They are not Russian but Uzbek, a Turkic nationality from the crossroads of the ancient Silk Road. Their music incorporates traditional ethnic folk tunes and poetry of Uzbekistan and other Central Asian and Middle Eastern cultures, along with contemporary pop and dance influences, into a unique international blend. They perform songs in more than 10 languages, including Arabic, Persian, Hindi, Nepalese and French as well as Uzbek and Russian.

Formed in the early 1970s, Yalla has appeared on Soviet national television as well as performing in Moscow and elsewhere in the Soviet Union, and on concert tours in Europe, Africa, Asia and Latin America, including featured appearances at the "Voice of Asia" festival.

The Yalla band had some changes at the time of collapse of the Soviet Union. The Immigration of Rustam Ilyasov (musical arranger and bass guitar) to the United States and independence of Uzbekistan made Yalla change their songs more local.

Some new hits came out, such as Uzbekistan, Bez lubimyh glaz and some more.

Yalla invited a dancer Roza Abdulhairiva to make a dance show mixed with singing.

Yalla has invited Tolkin Isakov who was a percussion teacher at the Tashkent State Conservatory. He replaced Rustam Ilyasov. Percussionist Ibragim Aliev was an addition to Yalla with a skillful performance on Uzbek national percussion instruments.

It was another pick of Yalla for few years (1994–1999).

References
  Фарух Закиров ("Ялла"): «Нам просто хотелось показать миру, что есть такая уникальная культура — Узбекистан» (интервью)
 Yalla "Uchkuduk"
 Yalla — Band

Uzbekistani rock music groups
Musical groups established in 1970
Soviet vocal-instrumental ensembles
1970 establishments in Uzbekistan